Lewis George Kellogg (May 17, 1856 – May 26, 1943) was a member of the Wisconsin State Senate.

Biography
Kellogg was born on May 17, 1856 in Fond du Lac County, Wisconsin. He attended Ripon College.

Career
Kellogg was a member of the Senate from 1913 to 1915. In addition, he was an alderman, school commissioner, and mayor of Ripon, Wisconsin. He was a Democrat.

References

External links

People from Ripon, Wisconsin
Democratic Party Wisconsin state senators
Mayors of places in Wisconsin
Wisconsin city council members
Ripon College (Wisconsin) alumni
1856 births
1943 deaths